The Perilestidae are a family of damselflies commonly known as shortwings and twigtails. It is a small family of around 19 species. All extant species are native to the Neotropical realm. In the past Nubiolestes of Africa was included in this family, but this is doubted. Palaeoperilestes electronicus is an extinct species described from mid-Cretaceous Burmese amber.

These damselflies are short-winged and have very long, slender, color-banded abdomens. They live in dense forest habitat and rest with their abdomens hanging vertically.

Genera
The family Perilestidae include the following genera:

Perilestes 
Perissolestes 
†Palaeoperilestes Zheng et al. 2016

References

Odonata families
Taxa named by Clarence Hamilton Kennedy
Lestoidea